Kerala Kamaraj Congress is a political party led by Vishnupuram Chandrasekharan that was founded on 25 October 2016 in the Indian state of Kerala.

References

Political parties in Kerala
Political parties established in 2016
2016 establishments in Kerala